Aksakov is a surname of Russian origin. The feminine version of this surname is Aksakova. Notable people with the surname include:

Alexander Aksakov (1832–1903), Russian author, editor, and parapsychologist
Anatoly Aksakov (born 1957), Russian politician and economist
Ivan Aksakov (1823–1886), Russian journalist and Slavophile intellectual
Konstantin Aksakov (1817–1860), Russian writer and Slavophile intellectual
Sergey Aksakov (1791–1859), Russian writer and critic, father of Ivan, Konstantin, and Vera
Vera Aksakova (1819–1864), Russian writer

See also
Aksakov (crater), crater on Mercury
Aksakov Museum, biographical museum in Ufa, Russia
Aksakovo

References

Russian-language surnames